The American Robert College of Istanbul ( or  ), often shortened to Robert, or RC, is a highly selective, independent, co-educational high school in Turkey. The school is situated in a  wooded campus on the European side of Istanbul in the Beşiktaş district, with the historic Arnavutköy neighborhood to the east and the upscale Ulus neighborhood to the west. Founded in 1863, Robert College is the oldest continuously operating American school outside the United States.

Robert College is consistently ranked as the top private high school in Turkey. The school has a long list of notable alumni, including entrepreneurs, politicians, journalists, artists, three Turkish prime ministers, four Bulgarian prime ministers, multiple members of the Turkish cabinet, Nobel laureate Orhan Pamuk and philanthropist Osman Kavala.

Robert College is a member of the G30 Schools group, and is accredited by the New York State Association of Independent Schools.

History 

In 1863, Robert College was founded in Bebek by Christopher Robert, a wealthy American philanthropist, and Cyrus Hamlin, a missionary devoted to education. Six years after its foundation, with the permission of the Ottoman Sultan, the first campus (currently housing Boğaziçi University) was built in Bebek at the ridge of the Rumeli Castle, very close to a Bektashi tekke, whose leaders maintained an excellent relationship with the Congregational and Presbyterian founders of Robert College, according to Friedrich Schrader, a German lecturer at Robert College during the 1890s. Hamlin, who became the first president of Robert College, was so preoccupied with the construction of the campus that George Washburn acted as the de facto head of the college from 1871 onwards. In 1877, he was officially named president by the trustees. During his tenure between 1877 and 1903, Washburn "gradually assembled a faculty of distinguished scholars who firmly established the college's academic reputation."

Christopher Robert died in 1878. According to the article "A Millionaire's Will" published in The New York Times on November 27, 1878, Robert left a great portion of his wealth to the college. In that same year, a college catalog was compiled, providing general information and an outline of the courses of study. Defining the aims of the college, the catalog stated: "The object of the College is to give to its students, without distinction of race or religion, a thorough educational equal in all respects to that obtained at a first-class American college and based upon the same general principles."

After Washburn, Robert College was administrated by Caleb Gates (1903–1932). During his presidency, the student body of the school underwent a major demographic transition; whereas the student body previously consisted of Bulgarian, Romanian, and other Christian minorities in the Ottoman Empire, the Young Turks' liberalization of policies directed towards foreign schools and an increasing demand amongst Turks for a western education resulted in considerable numbers of Turkish students enrolling. Founded at the time of the Ottoman Empire as an institution of higher learning serving the Christian minorities of the Empire as well as foreigners living in Constantinople, the school adopted a strictly secular educational model in accordance with the republican principles of Turkey in 1923. Robert College, at various points of its existence, had junior high school, high school, and university sections under the names Robert Academy, Robert Yüksek and American College for Girls. Since 1971, the current-day Robert College has functioned only as a "high school" (more comparable to the French lycée in academic rigor) on its Arnavutköy campus (formerly the campus of American College for Girls), yet it retains the title of "College". The Bebek campus and academic staff were turned over to the Republic of Turkey for use as a public university named Boğaziçi University, the renamed continuation of Robert College's university section.

Major events 

 1863, September 16: Robert College opened with 31 students at Bebek Seminary School.
 1922: President Caleb Gates and Hüseyin Pektaş (the first Muslim graduate and then vice-president of the college) attended the Conference of Lausanne representing foreign educational institutions in the Ottoman Empire.
 1932: WithPaul Monroe, the joint presidency system was adopted by Robert College (RC) and the American College for Girls (ACG). Robert Academy was the preparatory school for Robert College, which had a reputable engineering school. Instruction was bilingual, in Turkish and English.
 1957: Robert College was granted permission to become an institution of higher learning by the Republic of Turkey; Robert College Yüksek provided university-level instruction and is the precursor of the current Boğaziçi University. Robert Academy remained on the Bebek campus as a private high school.
 1971: Robert College Yüksek officially closed on 18 May and was renamed Boğaziçi University. The merger of the American College for Girls and Robert Academy as a co-educational private institution with junior high and high schools, on the Arnavutköy campus was officially confirmed in September 1971. Robert College's Bebek campus was donated to the Republic of Turkey. Boğaziçi University was established as a public university on this land.
 1998: With the adoption of a law calling for eight years of uninterrupted primary education in Turkey (junior high school would now be a part of primary education), the school stopped accepting students to its junior high school section.
 2004: The last junior high school students graduated and the school's junior high school section was officially closed. Now, Robert College has Prep, 9th, 10th, 11th, 12th grades, and accepts students who have finished compulsory primary education of eight years.

List of presidents and heads 

 Cyrus Hamlin, 1863–1877
 George Washburn, 1877–1903
 Caleb Frank Gates, 1903–1932
 Paul Monroe, 1932–1935
 Walter Livingston Wright, 1935–1943
 Harold Lorain Scott (acting president), 1943–1944
 Floyd Henson Black, 1944–1955
 Duncan Smith Ballantine, 1955–1961
 Harold Locke Hazen (acting president), 1961
 Patrick Murphy Malin, 1962–1964
 James L. Brainerd (acting president), 1965
 Dwight James Simpson, 1965–1967
 Howard P. Hall (Acting President), 1967–1968
 John Scott Everton, 1968–1971
 John Clay Chalfant, 1971–1977
 James Richard Maggart, 1977–1981
 Elizabeth Dabanovitch (acting head), 1981–1982
 Alan Donn Kesselheim, 1982–1984
 Margaret A. Johnson (Interim Head), 1984–1988
 Harry A. Dawe, 1988–1992
 Benjamin D. Williams III (interim head), 1992–1993
 Christopher Wadsworth, 1993–2001
 Livingston Merchant, 2001–2005
 John Russell Chandler, 2005–2012
 Anthony Jones, 2012–2015
 Charles H. Skipper, 2015–2019
 Adam Oliver, 2019–present

Academics 

, as per Turkish Ministry of National Education (MEB) regulations, Turkish is the instructional language of history and social studies classes.

Students 
Robert College accepts 180 to 220 students each year, who have scored within the top 0.2 percentile in a nationwide examination, which every Turkish student must take in order to study in a high school (secondary education) after they complete their primary education. The school has around 1000 students each academic year.

In the 1998–1999 academic year there were 942 students, with 99% having Turkish nationality.

Circa 1904, the school had about 300 students, with boarding space for about 200. Lucy Mary Jane Garnett wrote in the 1904 work Turkish Life in Town and Country that at that time most of the students were Christian as the college had a requirement for students to attend Christian Sunday church services and chapel services, and "it would be unsafe for any professed Moslem to become either a resident or a daily student" since the Ottoman government would take a dim view of a Muslim going to chapel. In 1904, Greek students made up the majority and other students included significant numbers of Armenians and Bulgarians.

Faculty and staff 
The faculty have an average of 20 years of teaching experience and the majority have either Turkish or United States citizenship. The school currently has faculty who are 50% Turkish, and 48% native English speakers (including faculty from English-speaking countries other than the United States). Sixty percent of the full-time faculty hold master's degrees or higher.

 there were 102 teachers, with 45% being Turkish and 32% being American. Of the teachers, eight were part-time. The school's guidance counselors, as of that year, were English-speaking Turkish citizens.

, as per Turkish Ministry of National Education regulations, the school employs only Turkish citizens to teach history and social studies classes.

, the school pays its foreign employees funds so that their children may attend Istanbul International Community School. If an employee chooses another school, Robert College will pay an equivalent amount.

In 1904, the faculty included Americans, Turks, Armenians, Bulgarians, and Greeks.

Curriculum 
Robert College is a five-year high school, with the first year (Prep) being the English immersion year that prepares students for rigorous curriculum, which is mostly in English. English is the language of instruction used in Science, Mathematics, Literature, Physical Education, Art and Music courses. Turkish is the required language of instruction in social sciences and Turkish language/literature.

Higher education 
Robert College graduates traditionally continue their education in the United States or Turkey, though in recent years the number of students studying in Canada and the United Kingdom increased. Every year, approximately 50–60 percent of the graduating class choose to study abroad, while those wishing to study in Turkey get placed in a university based on their score on the Core Proficiency Test-Advanced Proficiency Test (TYT-AYT). In 2006, Robert College ranked first in all three sections of ÖSS, a formerly-administered Student Selection and Placement System test, among private high schools in Turkey, with 76 out of 132 students taking the exam scoring in the top 0.3% (top 5000). Out of the 104 students who chose to study in Turkey, 29 were admitted to Boğaziçi University, which is the overall highest ranking school in Turkey. 56 students chose to continue their education abroad and 36% of these students are attending Ivy League colleges. In 2011, Robert College placed 123 graduates in Turkish universities, 21 of them, 40%, in Boğaziçi University. Another 53 planned to study abroad, 8 (15%) in the Ivy League. Of the 79 students who had applied abroad, 75 were offered admission.

Co-curricular activities 
Robert College has a rich history of co-curricular activities and sports, with about 100 student activity clubs as of 2015. Robert College introduced basketball to the Ottoman Empire in 1907. The first Student Council in Ottoman Empire was also formed in 1908 in Robert College.

Student Council 
Student Council is formed of a group of annually elected student governors and a faculty advisor. The elected body is proportional with class size. As well as class representatives, the president, the vice president, the secretary and the treasurer are elected after a period of campaigning. Student Council is responsible for facilitating communications between students, faculty and administration, as well as organizing social activities and fundraising for clubs. Student Council also organizes the largest and oldest high school festival, Fine Arts Festival, in Turkey. The President of the Student Council, representing the student body, makes a speech during the opening, closing, and graduation ceremonies.

Publications

English 
 Bosphorus Chronicle: The school's newspaper published quarterly (first published in 1959).
 Record: The Yearbook.
 Kaleidoscope: The English literature magazine.

Turkish 
 Köprü (The Bridge): The school's Turkish newspaper, published bimonthly (first published in January 2009).
 Martı (Seagull): Turkish literature journal.
 Oda (Room): Turkish literature journal publishing poems, stories and photos submitted by students.
 Tarih (History): The History Club's annual publication.
 Sinek (Fly): The Film Review Club's annual publication.

Conferences and festivals

Fine Arts Festival (FAF) 
The Fine Arts Festival is the largest secondary school festival in Turkey. It has been held annually since 1982 by the Robert College Student Council. Each year, more than 2,000 people attend the festival, which is traditionally held in May. The festival is a big event in which many student groups can perform on stage. There are various art exhibitions and dance shows that also take place. Student Council members visit other high schools in Istanbul and advertise for this event. At the end of the festival, a well-known artist or band typically performs on stage. Most of the revenues used to fund this event are raised through food and ticket sales. Food vendors are usually selected by Student Council members and consist of restaurants close to Robert College such as "kumpir" sellers in Ortaköy. This promotes the tight-knit Robert College community spirit.

International Istanbul Youth Forum (IYF) 
The International Istanbul Youth Forum is an annually held conference at Robert College. It has been organized every year since 2006 with participants from numerous European countries. Each year, more than 150 participants from all over Europe gather at the RC campus. The conference is organized by the Robert College European Youth Club.

Ethics Forum 
The Ethics Forum is the first to be established at high school level in Turkey. Robert College Ethical Values Club organizes an ethics case study contest at national level among high school students, following their forum. The results are announced at the Ethics Conference near the end of the year. Both events attract more than twenty public and private schools from around Turkey.

Robert College International Model United Nations (RCIMUN) 
Robert College International Model United Nations (RCIMUN) is a THIMUN-affiliated Model United Nations conference organized annually by the Robert College Model United Nations Club (RCMUN) since 2006. The conference includes four General Assembly committees, those being the Political, Human Rights, Environment, and Disarmament Committees, a Special Conference committee, the Security Council of UN, an Advisory Panel, ECOSOC, Specialized Agencies (RCSA), the equivalent of two intertwined historical committees which simulate a single historical event, a separate Historical Security Council, as well as a simulation of the International Criminal Court. Approximately 750 students, of which about 42% were from international schools attended the 2012 conference.

Istanbul Gençlik Forumu (IGF) 
Istanbul Gençlik Forumu is a national conference where representatives from over 30 high schools from different regions come together to discuss issues regarding the future of Turkey. In 2008, the fifth IGF welcomed over 250 participants. Discussions about international affairs are held in Turkish and each committee is responsible for writing a resolution. Then, at the General Assembly, each resolution is discussed and voted on. It is also the National Selection Conference of EYP Turkey, which is also recognized by the international office of European Youth Parliament. The conference is held annually and is organized by the Robert College European Youth Club.

Turkish Theater Festival (TIFES) 
Organized by the Robert College Theater Club, TIFES is one of the major theatrical events at high school level in Turkey. The festival takes place in Robert College campus during the first week of June. Numerous plays are put on stage during the week in Suna Kıraç Hall and famous actors, actresses and playwrights give talks on topics related to theatrical arts.

Junior Achievement Robert College Conference (JARC) 
Robert College Junior Achievement Club is hosting this event. About 300 Junior Achievement students from all over Turkey meet each other and share their experiences with others and famous entrepreneurs and artists related to the topics like Risk (2010), Alternative Careers (2009), Creating a Brand (2008). The entertaining workshop about these topics is a didacting icebreaking activity to strengthen the relationship between Junior Achievement students. The nearest conference is in April 2011.

Eurasian Schools Debating Championship (ESDC) 
The Eurasian Schools Debating Championships (ESDC) is an annually organized, WSDC-style debating tournament, that welcomes high school 
students representing a wide range of countries. While being the only student-run, high school level debating organization, it has gained a reputation as one of the best WSDC-style tournaments worldwide. With the participation of experienced judges, numerous national teams and outstanding debaters across the globe, it happened to be among the most popular debating organizations. In 2021, the organization rocketed with over 400 debaters and 98 teams from 20 countries.

Campus 
The  wooded campus overlooking the Bosphorus is home to five neoclassical buildings as well as three brutalist ones, centennial trees and a rich fauna, among which the Bosphorus Beetle, an endemic species to this campus, could be counted.

Major buildings 

Gould Hall: The oldest educational building on the campus, Gould Hall is a gift from Helen Gould Shepard, daughter of the famous 19th century Wall Street financier Jay Gould. She donated US$150,000 for the construction, which began in 1911 and was completed in 1914. The front and back entrances to the building lead to Marble Hall, named such due to the abundant usage of marble in its decor. Marble Hall acts as a lobby for the building, and also houses part of the school's archeological collection. The Faculty Parlor, formerly used as the teachers’ room, and the Conference Room, are both adjacent to and accessible from Marble Hall. Gould Hall also houses administrative offices, classrooms, the İbrahim Bodur library, the Heritage Room, and the RC Commons area, as well as the Turkish Literature and Social Sciences Departments, and the English Department Heads office. The building, particularly with its large ionic columns, is the de facto symbol of the school. Ivies and wisteria plants surround the building's walls. On its front entablature, the words "American College for Girls" and "Gould Hall" are visible. The cornerstone of the building, set on November 9, 1911, by then-United States Ambassador to the Ottoman Empire, William Woodville Rockhill, contains a time capsule. The inscription “AD MDCCCCXI”, denoting the year of the capsule's burial in Roman numerals, is displayed on the South Wing of the front façade.

Mitchell Hall: Originally home to the school kitchens and dining room, the building was a gift from Miss Olivia E. Phelps Stokes, who donated US$100,000. A modest woman, she asked for the building to be named in memory of her friend, Sarah Lindlay Mitchell. Today, the building houses classrooms used primarily for mathematics lessons, the Math Department, the Sait Halman Computer Center, the teachers’ room, the audio-visual center,  two Multimedia Rooms (MMRs), and a small English department office. The top floor, M400, is used for examinations, minor conferences, and weekly club sessions.
Woods Hall: Completed in 1914, the building was a partial gift from Mrs. Henry Woods of Boston, who donated US$58,000, with Helen Gould Shepard supplying the remaining US$25,000 required. It was used as a Science Building until 1990, and today is home to classrooms used primarily for English lessons, two English department offices, and two college counselling offices.
Sage Hall: A gift from Mrs. Margaret Olivia Sage, widow of Russell Sage, a famous 19th century financier and associate of Jay Gould, Sage Hall is one of the few buildings still used for its original purpose. A philanthropist, she donated US$100,000 for the building, built as a dormitory. Today, the building houses the girls' dormitories, infirmary, art studios and a darkroom.
Bingham Hall: Originally built as a medical school building, financed by William Bingham in memory of his mother, Mary Payne Bingham, the building housed the junior high school section from 1925 to 1992. Today, it is home to the boys' dormitories, as well as a secondary theater room, and business and administrative offices. A plaque commemorating the construction of the building, which reads  “Mary Payne Bingham Hall, erected in honor of Mary Payne Bingham by her son William Bingham 2nd”, is visible above the front entrance.
Feyyaz Berker Hall: Feyyaz Berker Hall, colloquially referred to as "Feyyaz", today houses the science labs and classrooms, as well as the Science Department. The building was completed in 1990, and named after its largest donor, leading Turkish businessman and Robert College trustee, Feyyaz Berker (Robert College Eng '46 alumnus). The front of the building has arched windows, which mimic the façade of Gould Hall. Contents of the Biology Museum, which has one of the rarest collections in Turkey, are scattered across the second and third floors of the building.
Suna Kıraç Hall: A state-of-the-art theater building completed in 1990, including a large stage, make-up rooms, modern sound and lighting system and seating for 512 people, was named after its largest donor Suna Kıraç (American College for Girls '60 alumnus), a leading Turkish businesswoman and Robert College Trustee. Its basement houses the music department and several music rooms.
Nejat Eczacıbaşı Hall: The modern school gymnasium was opened in 1990 and named after its largest donor, prominent Turkish bio-chemist and businessman Dr. Nejat Eczacıbaşı (Robert College '32 alumnus). Its basement houses the Multi-Purpose Room (MPR), P.E. department offices, and the Cep (Turkish for “Pocket”), a student lounge area.

İbrahim Bodur Library 
When founded in 1863, Robert College had four students. A sum of $2,120 had been allocated to the library, and Harvard University had donated 200 volumes for the opening of the library. During the 1950s and '60s, the college had one of the largest collections in Turkey. (In 1957: 111,598 books and 214 periodicals; the American College for Girls Library 27,163 books and 108 periodicals, according to the Turkiye Kütüphaneleri Rehberi (Turkish Libraries Guide) published by the Turkish National Library that year. After the foundation of Boğaziçi University, the college donated most of its collections to the newly founded university. Today, Robert College has a print collection of approximately 40,000 resources in both Turkish and English. It also has an expanding collection of eBooks, eMagazines and databases that can be accessed both on and off campus. The library went through an extensive renovation in 2014 and occupies an area of 1034 square meters, with a seating capacity of 290 people on the second and third floors of Gould Hall.

Other buildings and facilities 

 The Rodney B. Wagner Memorial Maze

 Murat Karamancı Student Center (MKSC)
 Dave Phillips Field
 Konak Terrace
 Tennis courts
 Basketball courts
 Faculty housing (Barton House, White House, Blue House, Yalı, Guest House, and numerous other houses dispersed on campus)
 Green Tower
 The Bridge and Security
 Forum

This section only includes the buildings on today's Robert College campus (formerly the campus of American College for Girls); the ones on the former boys campus of Robert College can be found in the Boğaziçi University article.

Tuition and finances 
Robert College's tuition fees, for the 2020–2021 academic year, are:

Tuition fees are adjusted each year according to the inflation rates in a limited range set by the Ministry of National Education (MEB).

Robert College has consistently ranked as the most expensive high school in Turkey by tuition. According to school data, 26% of students received some form of financial aid for the 2019–2020 academic year.

Robert College files its taxes in New York State through two separate 501(c)(3) tax-exempt non-profit organizations: the Trustees of Robert College of Istanbul, tax-exempt since December 1947, and the Robert College Foundation, tax-exempt since May 2000. The data is publicly available on ProPublica. As of Fiscal Year 2017, the two organizations reported a combined revenue of 28.7 million USD.

Tuition fees and donations constitute a significant majority of the school's income. In 2019, income from tuition fees covered 55% of the school's expenses, with most of the remainder being supplied by donations. A majority of donors are alumni of the school, though financial institutions and corporations have donated as well.

Criticism

Pervaneler 
, a Pan-Turkist author, wrote Pervaneler, a novel criticizing the foreign, anti-Turkish nature of the American College for Girls. Published in 1924, a year after the declaration of the Turkish Republic, the novel revolves around "Byzantium College", a fictionalized account of the American College for Girls. The story includes Leman, a young Turkish Muslim woman attending Byzantium College. There, she befriends two Turkish girls, Nesime and Bahire. Nesime is the daughter of a famous Mevlevi Sheik, Amir Çelebi. Her education at Byzantium College alienates her from her Turkish and Muslim identities, leading her to convert to Protestantism to migrate to the United States. Bahire is a woman who "dresses like a man", rejects her gender roles, and is captivated by the western feminist movement. She also moves to the United States to attend feminist lectures. Leman, influenced by her friends, meets Jack Peterson, an American soldier in deployment, and escapes to the United States to marry him. These three figures represent cautionary tales for what the author believes will happen to Turkish youth in non-national educational institutions.

In the novel, Byzantium College is depicted as the principal institution corrupting young Turkish women — both a literal and figurative enclave of the foreign powers who invaded, but failed to hold Istanbul. According to the novel, the "Greek" and "foreign" architecture of the school — possibly a reference to the Greek ionic columns of Gould Hall — provides those visiting its campus a sense of entering into a separate country. Throughout the book, the school is described thus: "truly, this was the capital city of an American-Armenian country... [it was] like a separate country within our motherland". Similar anti-Armenian sentiments dominate the novel: in the school's museum, artifacts by Armenian, Greek, Bulgarian, Serbian, and Russian peoples are displayed, whereas Turkish culture is denied.

2014–2015 admittance scandal 
In the 2014–2015 academic year, a student was admitted to Robert College with a lower high school entry exam score than was required. The admitted student was the twin sister of another student who had gained admission to Robert College with her exam score. On 25 March 2015, Hürriyet reported that the student was admitted to Robert College with the instruction of the Ministry of National Education (MEB). Responding to reports by the media of unfair conduct, the headmaster at the time, Anthony Jones, stated in a letter that "the numerous administrative objections made to [the MEB ruling] by our school have been denied, and we are by law obliged to abide by this ruling."

It was later reported that the student in question could not attend lessons due to "a literal meat shield of students" blocking her, and that she dropped out shortly thereafter.

Yeni Akit
A government-aligned Islamist newspaper and website, Yeni Akit has published three articles on Robert College since 2017. The first, entitled "Heresy in Robert College" (Turkish: "Robert Koleji'nde Sapkınlık") was an attack on the school's LGBTQ week. Authored by Faruk Arslan, the homophobic article characterized homosexuality as a "disease", with the subheading "the American Robert College joined the choir of heretics representing the disease of homosexuality as a normal human condition."

In 2018, Faruk Arslan published another article, entitled "The Headscarf Hate of Robert College" (Turkish: Robert Koleji'nin Başörtü Düşmanlığı), claiming that Islamic headscarfs were banned by the school dress code. In reality, religious headscarfs are allowed in Robert College.

Another article in 2018 by the same author questioned the source of Robert College's funding. In "Where Did Robert College's 900 Trillion [Million] Come From, Where is it Going?" (Turkish: Robert Koleji'ne 900 Trilyon Nereden Geldi, Nereye Gidiyor?), a conspiracy theory surrounding Robert College's finances is concocted. Arslan claims that the 137 million dollars that Robert College acquired within a 5-year span is a result of "the exploitation of Turkey's resources", and is being used for "US interests". In reality, Robert College raises funds through tuition and voluntary donations by its alumni. A 501(c)(3) tax-exempt non-profit organization, Robert College files its taxes in New York, and its expenditures are publicly available.

Notable alumni

Since the Ottoman period, Robert College alumni have played a leading role in numerous fields including the arts, academia, science, engineering, business, civil society and government administration. Garnett stated in her 1904 publication that "since its foundation forty years ago many of its graduates have attained to high positions in the Governments of the Balkan principalities, and otherwise distinguished themselves." Three Robert College graduates were the representatives of their countries in the founding meeting of the United Nations held in San Francisco in March 1945: Nur al-Din Kahala for Syria, Hamiz Atif Kuyucak for Turkey and Dr. Shafaq for Iran.

In 1990, three alumni, Nejat Eczacıbaşı, Suna Kıraç and Feyyaz Berker donated the necessary funds for the construction of the new buildings that are mentioned in the Buildings section. An annual giving campaign raises funds for the school, as costs cannot be met by tuition fees alone. The development office publishes the RC Quarterly, which reaches 10,000 Robert College alumni around the world online and by mail.

Bizimtepe, a cultural and recreational center next to the campus, is an affiliate of the Alumni Association.

Notable former faculty 

 Tevfik Fikret, Turkish poet, leader of the Servet-i Fünûn movement, founder of the modern school of Turkish poetry
 Cahit Arf, mathematician
 Calouste Gulbenkian, entrepreneur and art collector
 Behçet Kemal Çağlar, poet
 Paul H. Dike, Professor of Physics
 John Freely, Professor of Physics, author
 Mebrure Gönenç, one of the first female members of the Turkish Parliament (alumna of the American College of Girls)
 Frances Harshbarger, one of the first female American mathematicians to receive a doctorate
 Necip Fazıl Kısakürek, poet and author
 Paul Lange, conductor of the Ottoman Empire's Royal Orchestra, musician, father of US conductor Hans Lange
 M. M. Mangasarian, Armenian-American atheist and secularist intellectual
 Arman Manukyan, Professor of Economy and Accounting
 Mihri Pektaş, one of the first female members of the Turkish Parliament (alumna of the American College of Girls)
 Dave Phillips, physical education teacher, played professional basketball for Beşiktaş JK
 Mary Paton Ramsay, literary scholar
 Friedrich Schrader, German journalist and author
 Stefan Panaretov, Bulgarian diplomat, Special Envoy and Minister Plenipotentiary of Bulgaria to the U.S. (1914-1925), Bulgarian representative to League of Nations
 Karl von Terzaghi, Austrian civil engineer, known as the "father of soil mechanics and geotechnical engineering"
 Edgar Rose, German-American mechanical engineer, MS from MIT in one year. Designed and produced the first 2=stroke outboard tuned exhaust system at Kiekhaefer Mercury in 1958. Chief of stern drive and snowmobile engineering at Outboard Marine Corporation at different times after 1968, and VP of engineering before his retirement in 1990. Active as chief inspector at APBA OPC outboard races until ca. 2014.

In popular culture 

 The  novel Pervaneler depicts “Byzantium College”, a fictionalized version of the American College of Girls, which gradually merged into Robert College, and whose campus Robert College currently occupies.
 In the Orhan Pamuk novel Silent House, Metin attends the “American High School”, a fictionalized version of Robert College.

See also 

Boğaziçi University
Istanbul International Community School (former sister school)
Education in the Ottoman Empire
 List of high schools in Turkey
 Koç School
 Üsküdar American Academy

Notes

References

Books on Robert College 
 Ali Neyzi, Alma Mater and the Story of Robert College
 Asya Orhon, Kolejlerin Koleji, Robert Kolej
 Betty Tank, Pushing My Shadow
 Caleb Frank Gates, Not To Me Only, Princeton, 1940.
 Cyrus Hamlin, My Life and Times, Boston, 1893.
 Cyrus Hamlin, Among the Turks
 Eren Yanık, Akvaryum
  via Internet Archive
 Hester Donaldson Jenkins, An Educational Ambassador to the Middle East
 John Freely, History of Robert College, Istanbul, YKY, 2000.
 Lynn Scipio, My Thirty Years in Turkey, New Hampshire, Ringde, 1955.
 Mary Mills Patrick, A Bosphorus Adventure, London, 1934.
 Mary Mills Patrick, Under Five Sultans
 May Fincancı, The Story of Robert College Old and New
 Moris Farhi, Young Turk
 Orhan Türker, Mega Revma'dan Arnavutköy'e, Istanbul, 2005
 Stevens Marcia & Malcolm, Against the Devil's Current: Life & Times of C.H.
 Talat S. Halman, Aklın Yolu Bindir, Istanbul, 2003.
 Ugur Ersoy, 1950–55 Erguvan Renkli Yıllar, Istanbul, 2004.

External links

Finding aid to the Robert College papers at Columbia University Rare Book & Manuscript Library
 Robert College
 Robert College Alumni Association
 Robert College Alumni Association of America
 The Student Council
 Fine Arts Festival
 RC Quarterly Robert College Alumni Magazine
 Robert College International Model United Nations Website
 Robert College EYC Website
 about Robert College
 RC Quarterly
 

Educational institutions established in 1863
Turkey–United States relations
High schools in Istanbul
American international schools in Turkey
International Baccalaureate schools in Turkey
Private schools in Turkey
University-preparatory schools
Bosphorus
Beşiktaş
1863 establishments in the Ottoman Empire